Air Foyle HeavyLift was an aviation company based in Bishop's Stortford, United Kingdom.  It specialised in heavy air cargo services.  It was the worldwide sales agent for Antonov Airlines of Kyiv, Ukraine.  This relationship ceased in June 2006, and Antonov Airlines now operates a joint venture marketing company Ruslan International with Volga-Dnepr JS Cargo Airlines of Russia.

History 
The company's Chairman and joint CEO was Christopher Foyle, also Chairman of Foyle's bookshop.

Air Foyle started operations as an executive air charter company with one Piper Aztec aircraft in 1978.  It grew its fleet of Aztec, Navajo and Chieftain aircraft by carrying passenger, cargo and aerial survey flights. In 1979 it pioneered the overnight carriage of courier traffic between the UK and Europe operating a nightly flight between Luton and Brussels for Skypak (later a TNT company). In 1985 it started providing larger cargo aircraft to TNT, by then its principal cargo customer, using wet leased Handley Page Dart Herald aircraft operating nightly from Birmingham to Nuremberg and Hannover and these were later replaced by a BAC One-Eleven jet cargo aircraft and then by a Boeing 737-200QC aircraft wet leased from Aer Lingus. When TNT announced that it would order 72 British Aerospace 146 aircraft converted to freighters, Air Foyle won the contract to operate these aircraft on behalf of TNT, then an Australian company.  This operation commenced in May 1987 with one BAe 146 aircraft and rapidly expanded to ten such aircraft which Air Foyle then operated for thirteen years for TNT on a nightly schedule from various airports in the UK and mainland Europe into TNT's hub in Cologne and later Liège.

In 1985 Air Foyle took delivery of the first production Edgley EA-7 Optica aerial observation aircraft. Subsequently, while being operated by Hampshire Police this aircraft was destroyed in a fatal accident.

In 1994 Air Foyle won a contract to operate one Lockheed L-100 Hercules and one Ilyushin Il-76 aircraft on permanent 24/7 standby for Oil Spill Response Limited, to provide immediate response on a worldwide basis in the event of a major oil spillage.

Adopting the TNT aircraft management principle, Air Foyle and then its sister passenger airline Air Foyle Passenger Airlines operated a variety of aircraft including Boeing 707-300F, 737-200, 737-300, 727-200, Airbus A320 and A300 for a number of airline and virtual airline customers including EasyJet, Sunseeker, Sabre, Virgin Express, Debonair, Color Air, and Air Scandic from 1993 until 2000.

Soviet deal 
In 1989, following two years of negotiations with the Soviets, Air Foyle became the worldwide General Sales Agent of the Antonov Design Bureau of Kyiv and became responsible for the marketing and sales and commercial and operational management of Antonov's fleet of AN-124 heavy cargo aircraft.

Between 1998 and 2000 Air Foyle bid an AN-124 solution for the Ministry of Defence Short-Term Strategic Airlift (STSA) procurement. After a protracted procurement process, Ministers in the Ministry of Defence chose a very much more expensive Boeing C-17 solution. Air Foyle believed it had been misled during the procurement process about the basis for decision on the procurement. The Comptroller and Auditor General later concluded that the procurement process was "that the Department has not fully followed its own preferred practice in evaluating the Short Term Strategic Airlift proposals, but there is no evidence of illegality."

In July 2001 Air Foyle HeavyLift became the worldwide General Sales Agent of the Antonov Design Bureau of Kyiv, a function previously held from July 1989 by Air Foyle, one of the two 50% shareholders in Air Foyle Heavylift. Air Foyle Heavylift was not only responsible for the sales and marketing of charters and leases of Antonov's fleet of Antonov An-124-100, Antonov An-225 and Antonov An-22 heavylift cargo aircraft, but also for their complete commercial and operational management.

Antonov terminated the joint venture on 30 June 2006 to allow it to pursue a joint marketing venture with its erstwhile Russian competitor Volga-Dnepr under the name Ruslan International, in which it has a 50% stake.

Air Foyle and Air Foyle HeavyLift ceased trading in July 2006, AFH closed for business on 31 July 2006.

See also
 List of defunct airlines of the United Kingdom

References

Defunct airlines of the United Kingdom
Defunct cargo airlines
Airlines established in 2001
Airlines disestablished in 2006
Soviet Union–United Kingdom relations
2001 establishments in England
2006 disestablishments in England
British companies established in 2001
British companies disestablished in 2006
Cargo airlines of the United Kingdom